The 2000–01 Euroleague was the inaugural basketball season of the EuroLeague, under the newly formed Euroleague Basketball Company's authority, and it was the 44th season of the premier competition for European men's professional basketball clubs overall. It started on October 16, 2000, with a regular season game between hosts Real Madrid Teka and Olympiacos, which was held at the Raimundo Saporta Pavilion, in Madrid, Spain, and it ended with the last championship finals game on May 10, 2001, which was held at the PalaMalaguti arena, in Bologna, Italy.

This season did not feature all of the top-tier level European club basketball teams, as some of them opted to compete in the 2000–01 FIBA SuproLeague competition instead, after the row erupted between the previous EuroLeague governing body, FIBA, and the newly established Euroleague Basketball Company.

A total of 24 teams competed for the EuroLeague title, which was in the end won by Kinder Bologna. Dejan Tomašević was the EuroLeague Regular season MVP, and Manu Ginóbili was the EuroLeague Finals MVP.

European Champions' Cup teams divided 

The FIBA European Champions' Cup was originally established by FIBA and it operated under its umbrella from 1958 until the summer of 2000, concluding with the 1999–2000 season. Euroleague Basketball Company was created after the end of the FIBA European Champions Cup.

FIBA had never trademarked the "EuroLeague" name and had no legal recourse on the usage of that name, so they had to find a new name for their league. The following 2000–01 season started with two top European professional club basketball competitions: FIBA SuproLeague (renamed from the FIBA EuroLeague) and Euroleague.

Top clubs were split between the two leagues: Panathinaikos, Maccabi Elite Tel Aviv, CSKA Moscow, and Efes Pilsen stayed with FIBA, while Olympiacos, Kinder Bologna, Real Madrid, FC Barcelona, Tau Cerámica, and Benetton Treviso joined Euroleague Basketball.

Team allocation 
A total of 24 teams from 14 countries participate in the competition.

Distribution 
The table below shows the default access list.

The competition culminated in a best 3 out of 5 playoff series.

Teams 
The labels in the parentheses show how each team qualified for the place of its starting round

 1st, 2nd, etc.: League position after Playoffs
 WC: Wild card

Regular season 
The first phase was a regular season, in which the competing teams were drawn into four groups, each containing six teams. Each team played every other team in its group at home and away, resulting in 10 games for each team in the first stage. The top 4 teams in each group advanced to the next round, The Top 16. The complete list of tiebreakers is provided in the lead-in to the Regular Season results.

If one or more clubs were level on won-lost record, tiebreakers were applied in the following order:
 Head-to-head record in matches between the tied clubs
 Overall point difference in games between the tied clubs
 Overall point difference in all group matches (first tiebreaker if tied clubs were not in the same group)
 Points scored in all group matches
 Sum of quotients of points scored and points allowed in each group match

Group A 

Source:

Group B 

Source:

Group C 

Source:

Group D 

Source:

Playoffs

Round of 16 
In a best-of-three series the remaining 16 teams were placed against each other. The games were held between the 31st of January and the 14th of February, 2001, with the top 8 teams advancing to the Playoffs.

|}

Quarterfinals 
In a best-of-three series the remaining eight teams were placed against each other. The games were held between 21 February and 7 March 2001, with the top 4 teams advancing to the semifinals.

|}

Semifinals 
In a best-of-five series the remaining four teams were placed against each other. The games were held between the 27th of March and the 7th of April, 2001.

Finals 

The culminating stage of the Euroleague season, the two remaining teams that won the semifinal series played each other in a best-of-five series.

Awards

Top Scorer

Regular Season MVP

Finals MVP

Finals Top Scorer

All-Euroleague First Team

All-Euroleague Second Team

Round MVP

Regular season

Playoffs

Individual statistics

Rating

Points

Rebounds

Assists

Other statistics

Individual game highs

Aftermath 
In May 2001, Europe had two continental champions, Maccabi Tel Aviv of the FIBA SuproLeague and Kinder Bologna of Euroleague Basketball Company's EuroLeague. The leaders of both organizations realized the need to come up with a new single competition. Negotiating from the position of strength, Euroleague Basketball Company dictated proceedings, and FIBA essentially had no choice but to agree to their terms. As a result, the EuroLeague was fully integrated under Euroleague Basketball Company's umbrella, and teams that competed in the FIBA SuproLeague during the 2000–01 season joined it as well. It is today officially admitted that European basketball had two champions that year, Maccabi of the FIBA SuproLeague and Kinder Bologna of the Euroleague Basketball Company's EuroLeague.

A year later, Euroleague Basketball Company and FIBA decided that Euroleague Basketball's EuroLeague competition would be the main basketball tournament on the continent, to be played between the top level teams of Europe. FIBA Europe would also organize a European league for third-tier level teams, known as the FIBA Europe League competition, while Euroleague Basketball would also organize its own second-tier level league, combining FIBA's long-time Korać Cup and Saporta Cup competitions into one new competition, the EuroCup. In 2005, Euroleague Basketball and FIBA decided to cooperate with each other, and did so jointly until 2016.

In essence, the authority in European professional basketball was divided over club-country lines. FIBA stayed in charge of national team competitions (like the FIBA EuroBasket, the FIBA World Cup, and the Summer Olympics), while Euroleague Basketball took over the European professional club competitions. From that point on, FIBA's Korać Cup and Saporta Cup competitions lasted only one more season before folding, which was when Euroleague Basketball launched the EuroCup.

See also 
 2000–01 FIBA SuproLeague
 2000–01 FIBA Saporta Cup
 2000–01 FIBA Korać Cup

References and notes

External links 
 2000–01 Euroleague
 2000–01 Euroleague
 Eurobasket.com 2000–01 Euroleague

 
EuroLeague seasons